Bernarda Heimgartner (born Maria Anna Heimgartner, 26 November 1822 – 13 December 1863) was a Swiss Roman Catholic professed religious and the co-founder of the Sisters of the Holy Cross of Menzingen. Heimgartner founded this order alongside Theodosius Florentini in 1844 and served as its leader until three months before her death. She had become a professed religious of the Sisters of Divine Providence in 1843 and made her vows in 1844 before establishing her congregation.

Heimgartner's cause for sainthood commenced in 1952 under Pope Pius XII after being titled as a Servant of God. Pope John Paul II confirmed she had lived a life of heroic virtue and named her as Venerable on 26 March 1994.

Life
Maria Anna Heimgartner was born on 26 November 1822 in Switzerland as the fourth of six children of Heimrich Josef Heimgartner (1788–1836) and Anna Maria Trüb. Her father died in 1836 when she was fourteen and this forced her to assume greater home duties. Her maternal uncle – Karl – served as a church pastor.

Her initial education spanned from 1829 until 1837 in Fislisbach and then served as a nurse for children in Baden from 1838 until 1840. In 1840 – on the advice of her priest and confessor Theodosius Florentini – she received training as a teacher from Capuchin nuns.

She studied from 1841 until 1844 with the Ursulines in the German city of Freiburg in the Breisgau region. She entered the novitiate of the Sisters of Divine Providence in 1843. Heimgartner made her religious profession on 16 October 1844 in Altdorf in the name of "Bernarda" while relocating on 17 October 1844 to Menzingen.

Heimgartner and Florentini – with three others – established their congregation in October 1844 but conflicts with Florentini from 1854 to 1856 saw the separation of the two orders he co-founded: one in Ingenbohl and then her own.

Her time as the head of the order witnessed the establishment of a total of 59 homes and schools. Heimgartner would often mention that "our fountain of life is Divine Providence". In 1859 she was diagnosed with pulmonary tuberculosis. She relinquished her post as Mother Superior on 21 September 1863 to Sister Salesia Strickler.

Heimgartner died due tuberculosis on 13 December 1863. Her order was later aggregated to that of the Third Order of Saint Francis. As of 2005 there was 2132 religious in 244 houses while there were 138 German religious in 2013.

Beatification process
The beatification process commenced in two cities: Basel and Lugano. It started under Pope Pius XII in 1952 in an informative process that closed in 1955 – the 1952 opening saw the conferral of the title of Servant of God upon her.

Historians met to approve the cause in 1991 while the Congregation for the Causes of Saints validated the diocesan process on 18 June 1993. Theologians and the C.C.S. both voted in favor of the cause in 1993 and 1994.

Heimgartner was accorded the title of Venerable on 26 March 1994 after Pope John Paul II recognized that she had lived a life of heroic virtue.

The miracle required for beatification was investigated in the place that it had occurred in and received C.C.S. validation in 2006.

References

External links
Hagiography Circle
Saints SQPN
Sisters of the Holy Cross of Menzingen

1822 births
1863 deaths
People from Baden District, Aargau
Swiss Roman Catholics
19th-century venerated Christians
19th-century Swiss people
19th-century deaths from tuberculosis
Founders of Catholic religious communities
Venerated Catholics by Pope John Paul II
Tuberculosis deaths in Switzerland